Badryashevo (Bäźräş) is a rural locality (a village) and the administrative centre of Badryashevsky Selsoviet, Tatyshlinsky District, Bashkortostan, Russia. The population was 361 as of 2010. There are 6 streets.

Geography 
Badryashevo is located 11 km north of Verkhniye Tatyshly (the district's administrative centre) by road. Auk-Bulyak is the nearest rural locality.

References 

Rural localities in Tatyshlinsky District